The Code pénal is the codification of French criminal law (droit pénal). It took effect March 1, 1994 and replaced the French Penal Code of 1810, which had until then been in effect. This in turn has become known as the "old penal code" in the rare decisions that still need to apply it.

The new code was created by several laws promulgated on July 22, 1992. It introduced the judicial notion of fundamental national interests (Book IV, Title I).

History 
The Penal Code project began with the work of a commission created by President Valéry Giscard d'Estaing in a decree issued on November 8, 1974. The membership of the commission was set by a February 25, 1975 decree. The definitive draft of Book I (General Provisions), heavily criticised by the criminal justice community, was rejected by the Élysée Palace on February 22, 1980.

After government changed hands in the 1981 presidential election, Robert Badinter, a former criminal lawyer who had become Minister of Justice, returned to the idea of penal code reform. Badinter took over the chairmanship of the commission created in 1975, whose membership had been greatly modified. The penal code project was discussed in the Parliament between 1989 and 1991.

Book I was approved in 1991 and was rapidly followed by Books II, III and IV.

The nouveau code pénal (new penal code, as it was initially known) was the result of several laws promulgated July 22, 1992, which took effect on March 1, 1994. While the code theoretically remained the same, and kept the same title, Code pénal, the new code was not so much a modified or even a recast Code pénal de 1810, but rather an original work of composition and of writing, with a new outline, new principles and a new formulation of the law.

It introduced a number of new concepts, such as the criminal responsibility of moral persons (responsabilité pénale des personnes morales) apart from that of the State, (Article 121-2), and increased the sentencing for almost all délits and crimes.

Organizational structure 
The penal code is composed of two parts:
 The Legislation part is composed of: 
 Four original books: 
 Book I: General provisions
 Book II: Crimes and offenses against persons
 Book III: Crimes and offenses against goods
 Book IV: Crimes and offenses against the nation, the State, and the public peace. (political offenses)
 Book IV b: Crimes and offenses of war
 Three books added December 16, 1992:
 Book V: Of other crimes and offenses
 Book VI: Of contraventions
 Book VII: Provisions relatives to overseas
 The Regulation portion — (Decrees of the Conseil d'État) is composed of: 
 Four original books: 
 Book I: General dispositions
 Book II: Crimes and offenses against persons
 Book III: Crimes and offenses against goods
 Book IV: Crimes and offenses against the nation, the State and the public peace (political offenses)
 Three books were added December 16, 1992:
 Book V:  Other crimes and offenses
 Book VI: Contraventions
 Book VII: Provisions relative to overseas

Numbering scheme 

Breaking with prior usage in other legislative codes such as the Code civil, the Code de procédure civile or the Code de procédure pénale where the articles are numbered in an ascending order, valid only for a given period, the numbering of the Code pénal is more structured.

Its first article is not number 1, but 111-1, the first article of the first chapter of the first title of the first book, from right to left (big-endian). Thus the numbering of Article 432-1 in the legislative section allows the hierarchy to be retraced, as follows: 
 Article 432-1 of the penal code says "[l]e fait, par une personne dépositaire de l'autorité publique, agissant dans l'exercice de ses fonctions, de prendre des mesures destinées à faire échec à l'exécution de la loi est puni de cinq ans d'emprisonnement et de 75 000 euros d'amende".
 This is the first article (432–1) of Chapter 2 (432–1) titled "[d]es atteintes à l'administration publique commises par des personnes exerçant une fonction publique". 
 Chapter 2 (432–1) is part of Title 3: (432–1) titled "[d]es atteintes à l'autorité de l'État".
 Title 3 (432-1) is part of Book 4 (432-1) entitled "[d]es crimes et délits contre la nation, l'État et la paix publique".

This numbering of the articles, called décimale in 1.4.2. of the Légifrance légistique guide, does not have delimiters such as the periods in the default numbering of scientific documents composed in LaTeX, which is more compact but caps at nine the maximum value of the first three levels, i.e. book, title and chapter.

The section, sub-section and paragraph hierarchical levels are not taken into account in the numbering, for example:
 According to Article 132-16 "theft, extortion, blackmail and abuse of trust are all considered. for purposes of recidivism, the same offense."
 It's the first article of Paragraph 3 titled "[d]ispositions générales".
 Paragraph 3 is part of Sub-section 2, titled "[d]es peines applicables en cas de récidive". (Of penalties for repeat offenders)
 Sub-section 2 is part of section 1, titled "[d]ispositions générales".
 Section 1 is part of chapter 2 (132–16) titled "[d]u régime des peines".
 Chapter 2 (132–16) is part of title 3 (132–16) titled "[d]es peines".
 Title 3 (132–16) is part of book 1 (132-16) titled "[d]ispositions générales".
The article isn't number 132123-1 but number 16 of its chapter (132–16). However, a hierarchical structure can be discerned from the number of the article, for example :
 Article 131-36-12-1 of the penal code starts saying that "[p]ar dérogation [...] de la victime."
 It's the first article (131-36-12–1) of Article 12 (131-36–12–1) providing that "[l]e placement sous surveillance [...] mis à exécution."
 Article 12 (131-36–12–1) is part of Article 36 (131–36–12-1), which says "[qu'u]n décret [...] à l'article 131-35-1."
 Article 36 (131–36–12-1) is part of Sub-section 5 titled "[d]u contenu et des modalités d'application de certaines peines".
 Sub-section 5 is part of Section 1 titled "[d]es peines applicables aux personnes physiques".
 Section 1 is part of Chapter 1 (131–36-12-1) titled "[d]e la nature des peines".
 Chapter 1 (131–36-12-1) is part of Title 3 (131-36-12-1) titled "[d]es peines".
 Title 3 (131-36-12-1) is part of Book 1 (131-36-12-1) titled "[d]ispositions générales".
This numbering style, which originated in administrative regulations such as the Code général des collectivités territoriales, the Code de l'urbanisme, and the Code des impôts, allows new texts to be indefinitely added and interwoven without effect on the numbering. It is thus well-adapted to legislation that foresees indefinite future evolution.

Notes and references

See also 
 Codification (law)
  – (Code of Penal Procedure). Distinguish from Code pénal.
 , magistrate, co-author of the penal code project, head of the office of general criminal legislation, author of various works on criminal law
 Police Tribunal (France)
 Cour d'appel or Appellate court, describe procedures in common law jurisdictions, which differ from French appeals court procedure
 Court of Appeal (France) – differs considerably from common law appeal court procedures. 
 Court of Cassation – general scope, does not discuss France specifically
 Court of Cassation (France) – highest judicial court of appeal in French law; differs considerably from procedures in common law jurisdiction
 Delict – concept in civil law jurisdictions. French law discussed only in passing in this article, as one of several.
 Délit civil – 
 Délit criminel – in French criminal law, an offense of intermediate gravity, between contravention and crime, felony

External links 
  Legislation, Légifrance
 out-of-date English translation
 Regulation, issue of decrees by the Conseil d'État, Légifrance

1994 in France
1994 in law
Criminal codes
French criminal law